Beate-Uhse.TV is a private television station in Germany belonging to the Beate Uhse sex shop franchise, dedicated to softcore pornography. It is operated by tmc Content Group GmbH based in Berlin. Beate-Uhse.TV broadcasts daily from 20:15 to 5:45.

History
The Media Council of the Medienanstalt Berlin-Brandenburg (mabb) granted the broadcasting license in 2000. The erotic programme consists of a licensed program (feature films and series) and in-house productions (magazines, reports and documentaries). Target group are adults between 25 and 55 years. Although originally conceived for predominantly male viewers, the station has long been increasingly attracting couples and women.

All content is audited by Freiwillige Selbstkontrolle Fernsehen (FSF) and / or Freiwillige Selbstkontrolle der Filmwirtschaft (FSK) and released by the youth protection officer of the broadcaster.

On 23 October 2014, the operator of Beate Uhse TV, tmc Content Group GmbH, announced that it had carried out a relaunch of Beate-Uhse.TV and, in this context, is now also broadcasting under a new logo.

Distribution
Beate-Uhse.TV is available in SD quality in the pay-tv offer of Sky Deutschland in Germany and Austria.

Logos

References

External links
  

2001 establishments in Germany
German-language television stations
Pornographic television channels
Television stations in Berlin
Television stations in Austria
Television channels and stations established in 2001
Television pornography